Joseph Givard (7 May 1923 – 29 August 1981) was a Belgian footballer. He played in eight matches for the Belgium national football team from 1951 to 1957. He was also named in Belgium's squad for the Group 2 qualification tournament for the 1954 FIFA World Cup.

References

1923 births
1981 deaths
Belgian footballers
Belgium international footballers
Place of birth missing
Association footballers not categorized by position